Zgoša is a settlement in the Municipality of Radovljica in the Upper Carniola region of Slovenia.

Name
Zgoša was first attested in written sources as Guscha in 1075 (and as Goscha in 1085, Sgusch in 1394, and Zguoch in 1406).  The name derives from *Zgošča, created from a nominalized possessive adjective based on the personal name *Zgost. The name is believed to originally be a hydronym, *Zgošča (reka/voda) (literally, 'river/creek where Zgost lives'), shortened through ellipsis and the Upper Carniolan phonological development-šč- > -š-. Zgoša Creek, which flows through the settlement, is also referred to as Begunščica Creek today.

References

External links

Zgoša at Geopedia

Populated places in the Municipality of Radovljica